AFL MVP may refer to:

 American Football League Most Valuable Player Award
 Arena Football League Most Valuable Player Award
 Leigh Matthews Trophy, MVP of the Australian Football League